is a multi-purpose arena located in the Kyōbashi area of Osaka, Japan. The hall opened in 1983 and can seat up to 16,000 people. Built on a site area of 36,351 square meters, part of its form uses stone walls, modeled after those of the Castle and it won the Osaka Urban Scenery Architects Prize Special Award in 1984.

The hall may be reached on a short walk from either Osaka Business Park Station on the Osaka Municipal Subway Nagahori Tsurumi-ryokuchi Line or Osakajōkōen Station on the JR Osaka Loop Line. The hall is located in Osaka-jō Park, near Osaka Castle and is across a river from two other smaller concert halls.

It is used for some sports, such as judo championships and wrestling matches such as those for the New Japan Pro-Wrestling promotion for their annual NJPW Dominion event in 2020 NJPW started to use the venue for their New Beginning show, and is popular for concerts, with many native and international pop and rock music artists.

Each winter, 10,000 people come to the hall to participate in a performance of Beethoven's Symphony No. 9.

Building specification 
 Opening date: October 1, 1983
 Building area: 19,351.22 m2
 Total floor area: 36,173.80 m2
 Building: 3 floors, 1 basement
 Architecture: Nikken Sekkei
 Construction: Taisei Corporation, Matsumura-Gumi
 Total cost: 10.6 billion yen
 Facilities:
 Arena: 3,500 m2 (width 83.4 meters, length 48.2 meters, height 21 meters)
 Shiromi Hall: 827 m2
 Convention Hall: 159 m2

Events

Many popular musical acts have played the arena, including LiSA, Hikaru Utada, B'z, Mötley Crüe, Duran Duran, Red Hot Chili Peppers, Momoiro Clover Z, NMB48, Dir En Grey, Babymetal, Iron Maiden, Pink Floyd, Ayumi Hamasaki, Britney Spears, Janet Jackson, Whitney Houston, Celine Dion, Mariah Carey, Maroon 5, Misia, Kylie Minogue, Tina Turner, Gloria Estefan, Taylor Swift, Prince, L'Arc-en-Ciel, David Bowie, George Michael, Patrick Fiori, Bon Jovi, Alanis Morissette, Rod Stewart, Oasis, Alice in Chains, Nine Inch Nails, Green Day, Beyoncé, Christina Aguilera, Björk, David Guetta, Avril Lavigne, The Black Eyed Peas, Norah Jones, John Mayer, Sarah Brightman, Westlife, BoA, Girls' Generation, Justin Bieber, Ed Sheeran, E-girls, Exo, Shinee, BTS, Shishamo, Seventeen, Twice, Red Velvet, Scandal, Blackpink, Monsta X, iKON, NCT 127, Radwimps, One Ok Rock, Dead or Alive, Queen and Aqours.

See also 
 List of indoor arenas in Japan

External links

Official website (in English)
Osaka Government Tourism Bureau entry
Japan National Tourism Bureau

Basketball venues in Japan
Boxing venues in Japan
Indoor arenas in Japan
Judo venues
Sports venues in Osaka
Music venues in Japan
Music in Osaka
Osaka Castle
Sports venues completed in 1983
Music venues completed in 1983
1983 establishments in Japan